Saint Kitts and Nevis has competed at every edition of the Pan American Games since the twelfth edition of the multi-sport event in 1995. Saint Kitts and Nevis did not compete at the first and only Pan American Winter Games in 1990.

Medal count

Medals by sport

References